Oliver Marach and Mate Pavić were the defending champions, and successfully defended their title, defeating Matthew Ebden and Robert Lindstedt in the final, 6–4, 6–4.

Seeds

Draw

Draw

References

External links
 Main Draw

Doubles